Lordan Zafranović (born 11 February 1944) is a Croatian-Czech-Yugoslav film director. He was a major figure of the Yugoslav Black Wave.

Early life
Lordan Zafranović was born in 1944 in Maslinica, island of Šolta, in Axis-occupied Yugoslavia. He spent the first two years of his life in the El Shatt refugee camp together with his mother Marija and his elder brother Zdenko. After the war, the family reunited with father Ivan and moved to Split, where younger brother Andrija was born. He graduated in ship-engineering from the Split Marine School in 1962 and continued with studies in literature and fine arts at the Split Pedagogical Academy (later University of Split) from 1963 to 1967.

Work
Zafranović belongs to the Prague wave (sometimes also called Praška filmska škola), a generation of acclaimed Yugoslav directors who had studied at the Prague Film School (FAMU) around 1968. His peers were Rajko Grlić, Goran Marković, Goran Paskaljević, Srđan Karanović, and cameraman Predrag Pega Popović. A generation later, also director Emir Kusturica, cameraman Vilko Filač, and Lordan's younger brother, film editor Andrija Zafranović studied at FAMU. 
Lordan Zafranović started his film career as an amateur at Kino klub Split in 1961 at age 15. From 1965 onwards, he worked as a professional, entering FAMU in 1967 as an already mature author with festival experience and awards, namely for his seminal experimental short Poslije podne (Puška) (1968). He was awarded Master of International Amateur Film in 1966 and graduated in film directing as a master student of Academy Award winner Elmar Klos in 1971.

Lordan Zafranović's first feature films are Sunday (1969), with Goran Marković in the leading role, and Passion According to Matthew (1975), which earned him the critics' award at the Pula Film Festival. His best known work however is the cult film Occupation in 26 Pictures (1978), which he co-wrote, as his previous feature film, with acclaimed writer Mirko Kovač. The film reinvented the genre of the Yugoslav Partisan film with its lush Mediterranean setting of Dubrovnik and its aesthetics, contrasting the happiness of an affluent aristocratic family and her friends with the arrival of evil, through fascist occupation and violence, and the collapse of morale and society. The film was a huge box office hit in Yugoslavia and in Czechoslovakia. It won the Big Golden Arena for Best Picture at the Pula Film Festival. It was nominated for the Cannes Film Festival and submitted as Yugoslavia's entry for the Academy Awards. In Hollywood, the film was regarded as a favourite, if only the director agreed to shorten the scene of a brutal massacre in an autobus, the climax of the film. Zafranović declined – and lost the Oscar. He continued his WWII trilogy with The Fall of Italy (1981), set in his native island Šolta during the Italian occupation, which evolves around the rise and fall of a young Partisan officer who is corrupted by power, and Evening Bells (1986), also co-written with Mirko Kovač, which tells the life of a village lad (played by Rade Šerbedžija) who went to the city and became a Partisan, and who then ended up first in internment in Nazi Germany and second, after the Tito-Stalin split in 1948, in a Yugoslav prison. The Fall of Italy won him the Big Golden Arena for the second time, Evening Bells the Golden Arena for Best Director at the Pula Film Festival. In the mid-1980s Zafranović returned to more intimate themes, with films such as An Angel's Bite (1984) and Aloa: Festivity of the Whores (1988), notable for their psychological drama and erotics. He also directed numerous TV productions for Radio Television Belgrade and Radio Television Zagreb.

In his long and productive career, Zafranović succeeded in realizing his films without betraying his creative vision and professional ethos, against all odds. He has been praised as "one of the great masters of modernism" (Dina Iordanova), "one of the great masters of Yugoslav film", and "a Mediterranean classic whose films can be compared with those by Angelopoulos, Bertolucci or Liliana Cavani" (Ranko Munitić), whereas his enemies denounced him as a "regime's director" indulging in "manierism" (Nenad Polimac). British-Bulgarian film researcher Dina Iordanova correctly states that his "main occupation has been to explore the pressures experienced by ordinary people under extreme historical circumstances. His films challenge the deepest foundations of nationalism and question the justification of historical violence." As in the case of other authentic and free thinking Yugoslav directors, namely Dušan Makavejev or Želimir Žilnik, Zafranović's films often caused controversy. This culminated in his occupation with the crimes of the NDH and the Ustaše during World War II and his documentaries Jasenovac: The Cruelest Death Camp of All Times (1983) and Decline of the Century: The Testament of L.Z. (1993) about the war crimes trial against NDH Minister of Interior Andrija Artuković. His rich and eminent opus is currently rediscovered throughout the former Yugoslavia and beyond, also in Croatia. As Jasna Nanut puts it, Lordan Zafranović's work as a whole awaits critical valorization as "an indispensable and essential part of Croat cinematography."

Exile and return to Croatia
Shortly before the break-up of Yugoslavia in 1991, Zafranović joined the Central Committee of the League of Communists of Croatia in 1989 for a short period. Franjo Tuđman, the future first President of the Republic of Croatia, attacked him because of his movie Jasenovac: The Cruelest Death Camp of All Times (Krv i pepeo Jasenovca, 1985). Soon after Croatia's Declaration of Independence, Tuđman denounced him as an "Enemy of the Croatian people". Zafranović was forced to leave the country. He took along his film on Artuković, which he finished in exile as a personal account on the reemergence of fascist ideology and violence in Croatia: His Decline of the Century: The Testament of L.Z. (1993) is, in the words of Dina Iordanova "a powerful indictment of past and present-day Croatian nationalism". He settled in Prague and continued to work for Czech Television. More than a decade later, he returned to Zagreb to make his monumental TV series on Josip Broz Tito, Tito – the Last Witnesses of the Testament (2011), co-produced by Radio Television Zagreb. 

Currently, he is preparing his latest film The Children of Kozara (Zlatni Rez 42 (Djeca Kozare)), based on a script which he co-wrote with Arsen Diklić, on a young girl which is imprisoned in the Ustaša death camp of Jasenovac along with her two younger brothers, after being captured with her mother in the Kozara Offensive. The story follows her struggle for survival and escape from hell with the support of people who are not ready to allow that perilous, inhuman circumstances make them forget their own humanity.

Filmography

Amateur short films at Kino klub Split
 Sunday (Nedelja; 1961)
 The Boy and the Sea (Dječak i more; 1962)
 City of Split (Splite grade; 1962)
 Ranko the Producer (Proizvođac Ranko; 1962)
 Story (Priča; 1963)
 Diary (Dnevnik; 1964)
 Breath (Dah; 1964)
 Aria (Arija; 1965)
 Night and After Night's Night (Noć i poslije noći, noć; 1965)
 Concerto (Koncert; 1965)
 Rainy (An Innocent Saturday) (Kišno (Nevina subota; 1965)
 Sunny (Sunčano; 1965)
 Mistral (Maestral; 1967)
FAMU student films
 Rondo (1968)
 Lady Cleaner (Gospođa čistačica; 1969)
 The Last Tape (Posljedjna vrpca; 1970)
Professional films
 Long Live the Youth (Diary 2) ([Živjela mladost (Dnevnik 2); 1965)
 Portraits (Passing by) (Portreti (u prolazu); 1966)
 Little Rascal (Mali vagabund; 1966)
 Johnny Dear they Stole Your Gold (Dragi Džoni kradeju ti zlato; 1966)
 Day and Night (Piazza) (Dan i noć (Pjaca); 1966)
 Upper City (Gornji grad; 1966)
 Cavalcade (three films) (Kavalkada (tri filma); 1967)
 Girl X (Djevojka X; 1967)
 People (Passers-by) (Ljudi (u prolazu); 1967)
 Afternoon (Rifle) (Poslije podne (puška); 1967)
 Sunday (Nedjelja; 1969)
 Waltz (My First Dance) (Valcer (moj prvi ples); 1970)
 Ave Maria (My First Bender) (Ave Marija (moje prvo pijanstvo); 1971)
 Antique (Antika; 1971)
 The Seas (Mora; 1972)
 Suburbs of Isis (Predgrađe (Ibisa); 1972)
 Zavnoh (1973)
 Murder on the Night Train (Ubistvo u noćnom vozu; 1973)
 Chronicle of Crime (Kronika jednog zločinca; 1973)
 Labour Builds the City (Rad zida grad; 1974)
 Dream (de natura sonoris) (San (de natura sonoris); 1975)
 Passion According to Matthew (Muke po Mati; 1975)
 Zagreb Fair (Zagrebački velesajam; 1976)
 Film on Workers and Guests (Film o radnicima i gostima; 1977)
 Occupation in 26 Pictures (Okupacija u 26 slika; 1978)
 A Free Interpretation (Slobodna interpretacija; 1979)
 Zagreb Lives with Tito (Zagreb živi s Titom; 1980)
 The Fall of Italy (Pad Italije; 1981)
 Homeland (Vladimir Nazor) (Zavičaj (Vladimir Nazor); 1982)
 Angel's Bite (Ujed anđela; 1983)
 Jasenovac: The Cruelest Death Camp of All Times (Krv i pepeo Jasenovca; 1985)
 Evening Bells (Večernja zvona; 1986)
 Mare adriaticum (1986)
 Amorella (1987)
 Aloa (The Whores' Festival) (Haloa (Praznik kurvi); 1988)
 Decline of the Century: The Testament of L.Z. (Zalazak stoljeća: Testament L.Z.; 1993)
 Lacrimosa (The Vengeance is Mine (Má je pomsta (Lacrimosa); 1995)
 Who is M.Š. (Kdo je M.Š.; 2000)
 Terracotta Faces (Lica terakota; 2003)
 The Eyes of Beijing (Oči Pekinga; 2003)
 Celestial City Symphony (Simfonija nebeskog grada; 2003)
 Tito – the Last Witnesses of the Testament: 1. Prologue (Tito – posljednji svjedoci testamenta: 1. Proslov; 2011)
 Tito – the Last Witnesses of the Testament: 2. Underground (Tito – posljednji svjedoci testamenta: 2. Ilegala; 2011)
 Tito – the Last Witnesses of the Testament: 3. Daybreak (Tito – posljednji svjedoci testamenta: 3. Praskozorje; 2011)
 Tito – the Last Witnesses of the Testament: 4. Uprising (Tito – posljednji svjedoci testamenta: 4. Ustanak; 2011)
 Tito – the Last Witnesses of the Testament: 5. Pain and Hope (Tito – posljednji svjedoci testamenta: 5. Patnja i nada; 2011)
 Tito – the Last Witnesses of the Testament: 6. The Fight (Tito – posljednji svjedoci testamenta: 6. Borba; 2011)
 Tito – the Last Witnesses of the Testament: 7. Creation (Tito – posljednji svjedoci testamenta: 7. Stvaranje; 2011)
 Tito – the Last Witnesses of the Testament: 8. Victory and Reprisal (Tito – posljednji svjedoci testamenta: 8. Pobjeda i odmazda; 2011)
 Tito – the Last Witnesses of the Testament: 9. Conquest (Tito – posljednji svjedoci testamenta: 9. Conquest; 2011)
 Tito – the Last Witnesses of the Testament: 10. Blossoming (Tito – posljednji svjedoci testamenta: 10. Procvat; 2011)
 Tito – the Last Witnesses of the Testament: 11. 777 Weeks (Tito – posljednji svjedoci testamenta: 11. 777 sedmica; 2011)
 Tito – the Last Witnesses of the Testament: 12. Discord (Tito – posljednji svjedoci testamenta: 12. Razdor; 2011)
 Tito – the Last Witnesses of the Testament: 13. Death (Tito – posljednji svjedoci testamenta: 13. Smrt; 2011)
 Zeitgeist (Duh vremena; 2018)
Work in Preproduction
 Zlatni rez 42 (Djeca Kozare)
Work in Progress 
 Posljednja priča stoljeća (Ostrvo Balkan) 
 Karuso 
 Moć Ljubavi 
 Miss Sarajevo 
 Sestre 
 Bizarno

References

External links
 

Profile 
Full profile in English at the Croatian Film Database
English page of Zafranović's retrospective in Zagreb, December 2006
Režiser Lordan Zafranović 

1944 births
Croatian film directors
Croatian screenwriters
Living people
Academy of Performing Arts in Prague alumni
Vladimir Nazor Award winners
Golden Arena for Best Director winners
Yugoslav film directors
Central Committee of the League of Communists of Croatia members
Croatian politicians
Croatian documentary film directors
People from Split-Dalmatia County